Mugil is a genus of mullet in the family Mugilidae found worldwide in tropical and temperate coastal marine waters, but also entering estuaries and rivers.

Species
There are currently 16 recognized species in this genus:
 Mugil bananensis Pellegrin, 1927 (Banana mullet)
 Mugil brevirostris A. Miranda-Ribeiro, 1915 
 Mugil broussonnetii Valenciennes, 1836 (Broussonnet's mullet)
 Mugil capurrii Perugia, 1892 (Leaping African mullet)
 Mugil cephalus Linnaeus, 1758 (Flathead grey mullet)
 Mugil curema Valenciennes, 1836 (White mullet)
 Mugil curvidens Valenciennes, 1836 (Dwarf mullet)
 Mugil gaimardianus Desmarest, 1831 (Redeye mullet)
 Mugil galapagensis Ebeling, 1961 (Galapagos mullet)
 Mugil hospes D. S. Jordan & Culver, 1895 (Hospe mullet)
 Mugil incilis Hancock, 1830 (Parassi mullet)
 Mugil liza Valenciennes, 1836 (Lebranche mullet)
 Mugil longicauda Guitart & Alvarez-Lojonchere, 1976 
 Mugil margaritae Menezes, Nirchio, C. de Oliveira & Siccha-Ramirez, 2015 
 Mugil rubrioculus I. J. Harrison, Nirchio, C. de Oliveira, Ron & Gaviria, 2007
 Mugil setosus C. H. Gilbert, 1892 (Liseta mullet)
 Mugil thoburni  D.S. Jordan & Starks, 1896 (Thoburn's mullet) 
 Mugil trichodon Poey, 1875

References

 
Mugilidae
Taxa named by Carl Linnaeus
Extant Rupelian first appearances
Rupelian genus first appearances